WBRP (107.3 FM) is an American radio station  broadcasting a talk radio format. Licensed to Baker, Louisiana, United States, the station serves the Baton Rouge area.  The station is currently owned by Guaranty Broadcasting Company of Baton Rouge, LLC.  Along with four other sister stations, its studios are housed at the Guaranty Group building on Government Street east of downtown Baton Rouge, and its transmitter is located east of Cortana Mall in the city.

History
WBBU signed on in 1994. The station went through a number of formats before switching to country legends in 2004.

On September 22, 2010, WTGE changed its call letters to WYPY, previously used on 100.7 FM.

On April 11, 2011, WYPY changed its call letters to WBRP and the classic country format moved over to 104.9. A week later, the station flipped to talk, branded as "Talk 107.3". Programs include a local morning show hosted by Brian Haldane, a local afternoon show hosted by Jay Ducote, and national shows from Brian Kilmeade and Dave Ramsey.

When 2023 came, they dropped the late afternoon “Jay Ducote Show” and added “The Moon Griffon Show” weekday mornings from 9 to 11 plus they dropped CBS News on top of the hour for ABC News.

References

External links

Radio stations in Louisiana
News and talk radio stations in the United States
Radio stations established in 1994
1994 establishments in Louisiana